Otomar Hájek (December 31, 1930 - December 18, 2016) was a Czech-American mathematician, known for his contributions to dynamical systems, game theory and control theory.

He was born in Belgrade in Serbia, moving with his family to Prague in 1935, to the Netherlands in 1939 and via Algerie and southern France to London in 1940 where they lived until 1945 when they returned to Prague.  After high school in 1949 he studied mathematics at  Charles University in Prague, resulting in a Ph.D. in 1963 on a thesis entitled Dynamical systems in the plane.  At the same place he joined the mathematics and physics faculty in 1965, before moving in 1968 to Cleveland and Case Western Reserve University where he worked until 1995 as professor, becoming an emeritus in 1996.

In the mid-1970s Hájek was also in receipt of a von Humboldt award at the TH Darmstadt, Fachbereich Mathematik.

Books

References

1930 births
Czech mathematicians
Czechoslovak emigrants to the United States
Case Western Reserve University faculty
American people of Czech descent
Mathematicians from Prague
2016 deaths